U-154 may refer to one of the following German submarines:

 , a Type U 151 submarine launched in 1917 and that served in World War I until sunk on 11 May 1918
 During the First World War, Germany also had this submarine with a similar name:
 , a Type UB III submarine laid down in 1917
 , a Type IXC submarine that served in World War II until sunk on 3 July 1944

Submarines of Germany